Messias Rodrigues da Silva Júnior (born 3 November 1994) is a Brazilian footballer who plays as a central defender for Santos.

Club career

América Mineiro
Born in São Mateus, Messias represented the youth academy of São Mateus and Cruzeiro before moving to the academy of América Futebol Clube (MG) in 2013. On 2 February 2014, he was promoted to the senior team, signing a deal which would keep him at the club until 2016. On 28 November 2015, he made his first team debut, starting in a 0–0 draw against Botafogo in Série B.

In the 2016 season, Messias played his first league match in a 2–0 defeat against Sociedade Esportiva Palmeiras, replacing the injured Roger. He played regularly in the 2017 season, featuring 47 times for the club and scoring one goal, with his side winning the Série B and thus achieving promotion to Série A.

On 5 January 2018, Messias' contract was extended until December 2022. On 30 January of the following year, Messias was loaned out to Portuguese club Rio Ave until the middle of 2020 for  200,000.

Upon returning, Messias became a regular starter for Coelho, helping with three goals in 36 league appearances as the club returned to the first division.

Ceará
On 24 March 2021, Messias signed a contract with fellow top tier side Ceará until December 2023.

Santos
On 7 December 2022, after Ceará's relegation, Messias signed a three-year contract with Santos also in the top tier. He made his debut for the club the following 22 January, starting in a 1–1 Campeonato Paulista away draw against São Bernardo.

Career statistics

Honours
América Mineiro
Campeonato Brasileiro Série B: 2017

References

External links

1994 births
Living people
Sportspeople from Espírito Santo
Association football defenders
Brazilian footballers
América Futebol Clube (MG) players
Ceará Sporting Club players
Santos FC players
Campeonato Brasileiro Série A players
Campeonato Brasileiro Série B players
Rio Ave F.C. players
Primeira Liga players
Brazilian expatriate footballers
Expatriate footballers in Portugal
Brazilian expatriate sportspeople in Portugal